Burnett Heads is a coastal town and locality in the Bundaberg Region, Queensland, Australia.

Geography
The locality of Burnett Heads is on the southern side of the Burnett River at its mouth into the Coral Sea.The river forms the western and northern boundaries, while the ocean forms most of the eastern boundary.

The land use is a mixture of residential (mostly with proximity to the coast), industrial (mostly the Port of Bundaberg) and some agricultural use (growing sugarcane). There is a network of cane tramways to transport the harvested sugarcane to the Millaquin sugar mill for processing.

History
Burnett Heads Provisional School opened on 3 April 1878. On 17 September 1888, it became Burnett Heads State School.

In February 1883, land surveyed by Charlton and Gardiner, licensed surveyors, in the township of New Bundaberg was offered for sale in the Victoria Hall, Bundaberg. The locality map advertising the sale also shows land in the Barolin Marine Township Estate to be offered for sale on the same day. The Maryborough Chronicle later reported that the Bundaberg town allotments sold well, recording the buyers and prices paid while the Barolin estate did not sell so well on the day. In February 1883 and Barolin Estate was auctioned by three auctioneers: Bryant and Co., John Cameron and W. E. Curtis. A map advertising the estate shows the estate to be close to Burnett River.

Methodist services were held at the Burnett Heads State School, until a Methodist Church was opened in 1903.

Burnett Heads Post Office opened by 1919 (a receiving office had been open from 1888), closed in 1924 and reopened around 1942.

On Sunday 3 May 1931, Archbishop James Duhig consecrated a new Roman Catholic Church in Burnett Heads. It was entirely funded by the Zunker family in memory of their dead parents. Over 1000 people attended the ceremony.

Archbishop William Wand laid the foundation stone for St John the Divine Anglican Church on Sunday 6 August 1939. The land for the church had been donated by Christian Mittleheuser.

In 1958, the Port of Bundaberg was established at Burnett Heads to better support the sugar industry and the larger ships being employed. The port of Bundaberg originally operated from the town reach of the Burnett River at Bundaberg with the Bundaberg Harbour Board being established in 1895. A major dredging project was undertaken in 2001 to cater for even larger vessels.

Aboriginal and Torres Strait Islander people made up 3.8% of the population. 80.5% of people were born in Australia. The next most common country of birth was England at 4.0. 91.9% of people spoke only English at home. The most common responses for religion were No Religion 31.0%, Anglican 22.5%, Catholic 16.3% and Uniting Church 7.7%.

Heritage 
The town's most notable feature is its historic timber lighthouse, the Old Burnett Heads Light, dating from 1873. The structure, originally sited on South Head (the southern entrance to the Burnett River), was replaced by a modern structure in 1971; the original lighthouse was restored and moved to a local park off Mittelheuser Street. It includes the original Fresnel lens.

Economy 
The Port of Bundaberg is located on the Burnett River at Wharf Drive. It is operated by Gladstone Ports Corporation. It has two wharves:

 Sir Thomas Hiley Wharf for sugar, gypsum, wood pellets, bulk liquids, molasses and formerly silica sand.
 John T. Fisher Wharf for molasses imports, but is no longer in use due to aged wooden wharf needing major works, all imports and exports are handled by the Sir Thomas Hiley Wharf, there is however plans to repurpose the John T Fisher Wharf so it can be used to load items such as woodchip etc.

Education 
Burnett Heads State School is a government primary (Prep-6) school for boys and girls at Burnett Heads Road. In 2018, the school had an enrolment of 146 students with 11 teachers (9 full-time equivalent) and 13 non-teaching staff (8 full-time equivalent).

There is no government secondary school in Burnett Heads. The nearest government secondary school is Kepnock State High School in Kepnock to the south-east.

Facilities 
Burnett Heads Fire Station is at 15 Brewer Street.

Burnett Heads SES Facility is at 13 Brewer Street beside the fire station.

Volunteer Marine Rescue Bundaberg has its base at 51 Harbour Esplanade.

Amenities 
St John the Divine Anglican Church is at 1 Paul Mittelheuser Street. A service is held every Saturday.

Burnett Heads Uniting Church is at 14 Zunker Street. A service is held every Sunday morning.

There are a number of parks in the area:

 4BU Park
 Abberton Park

 Dorothea Mackellar Park

 Gorman Park

 Jack Strathdee Memorial Park

 Memorial Park

 Pilot Station Reserve

 QCWA Park

 Simpson Park

Events 
In recognition of its lighthouses, Burnett Heads stages the annual Lighthouse Festival on the last Saturday in October.

References

External links 

 University of Queensland: Queensland Places: Burnett Heads

Town map of Burnett Heads (north), 1972
Town map of Burnett Heads (south), 1973

Towns in Queensland
Coastal towns in Queensland
Bundaberg Region
Localities in Queensland